"Follow Me Down" is a song by American rock band The Pretty Reckless from their second studio album, Going to Hell (2014). The song was written by the band's lead singer Taylor Momsen, while production was done by Kato Khandwala. It was serviced to active rock radio in the United States on November 18, 2014, serving as the album's fifth and final single. The track's intro features former pornographic actress Jenna Haze, a close friend of Momsen's, simulating an orgasm, which was removed from the radio edit.

The song topped Billboards Mainstream Rock Songs chart in May 2015, becoming the band's third consecutive number one on the chart, as well as tying Halestorm for the most number ones by a female-fronted band since the chart launched in 1981.

Charts

Weekly charts

Year-end charts

Release history

References

2014 singles
2014 songs
The Pretty Reckless songs
Razor & Tie singles
Songs written by Taylor Momsen